This is a list of songs written by Kenny Gamble and Leon Huff, either together as a  songwriting partnership, with other writers, or individually.

Notable songs written by Kenny Gamble and Leon Huff

Notable songs written by Kenny Gamble solo or with other writers

Notable songs written by Leon Huff solo or with other writers

References

Gamble and Huff
American rhythm and blues songs